Mangelia anthetika is an extinct species of sea snail, a marine gastropod mollusk in the family Mangeliidae.

Description
The length of the shell attains 12.4 mm, its diameter 4.8 mm.

Distribution
This extinct marine species was found in the Alum Bluff Group, Florida, USA

References

External links

anthetika
Gastropods described in 1947